Paungbyin, also known as Pyaungbin or Phaungbyin, is a town in Mawlaik District, Sagaing Division, of Myanmar, on the Chindwin River. It is the principal town of Paungbyin Township.

References

External links
Map of Sagaing Division Asterism
"Paungbyin Map — Satellite Images of Paungbyin" Maplandia

Populated places in Sagaing Region
Township capitals of Myanmar